New Barlborough is an area of Barlborough village, Bolsover, Derbyshire, England, consisting of several housing estates and a single row of houses along the A619, between Chesterfield and Worksop.

History 

The area of New Balborough really emerged immediately in the post-Second World War era. In its rural location, and on a busy main road, it attracted commuters, and so sprang-up with a row of commuter homes. With the construction of the M1 motorway, literally behind the homes, and the construction of junction 30, it continued to grow and prove popular.

In the 1950s the local District Council built a large Council Estate connecting New Balborough, physically, with Barlborough. The Council Estate was undertaken to house miners for the local colliery.

Following the closing down of the local colliery site, just south-east of the A619, the site was cleared, and in 1997, construction began of a series of new housing estates for commuters, which came to include a Yachting Club, with a lake, and a Holiday Inn.

Villages in Derbyshire
Bolsover District